The Ranks of the Independent State of Croatia Armed Forces are the ranks used by the Independent State of Croatia, it had similar insignia to those of the Armed Forces of Nazi Germany.

Officers

Rank flags

Enlisted and NCOs

References

External references
 
 

Military of the Independent State of Croatia
Independent State of Croatia